Blalock, meaning "dark-haired person" (Middle English Blakelok), is an English surname. It may refer to:

 Alfred Blalock (1899–1964), American innovator in the field of medical science
 Hank Blalock (born 1980), American baseball third baseman
 Hubert M. Blalock Jr. (1926–1991), American sociologist
 Jane Blalock (born 1945), American professional golfer
 Joe Blalock (1919–1974), American football player
 Jolene Blalock (born 1975), American actress
 Justin Blalock (born 1983), American football offensive guard
 Malinda Blalock (–), female soldier during the American Civil War
 Patricia Swift Blalock (1914–2011), American librarian, social worker, and civil rights activist
 Will Blalock (born 1983), American basketball player

See also
Blaylock
Blelloch

English-language surnames